The Museum of the University of Wrocław is a museum in Wrocław (Poland) displaying many of the historical objects of the University of Wrocław.

Museum was established on 6 August 1992 as the result of converting the Museum Collection Department of the Archives of the University of Wrocław into an independent unit within the central administration. The Museum's Department “House of Archeologists” on campus at Koszarowa 3 (building no. 8), where temporary archeological exhibitions are presented, was established on 13 May 2005.

The Museum is located in Wrocław on the Odra riverbank, in the University's main building (Uniwersytecki Square 1) designed by :de:Christoph Tausch in Baroque style. Its architectural structure with splendid sculptural decor and paintings is regarded as one of the most valuable Baroque monuments in Poland and Central and Eastern Europe.

Structure
The Museum consists of the following historical halls:

•	:pl:Aula Leopoldina, the biggest and most representative hall in the main building, is the only secular Baroque interior in Poland with full decor  - illusionist wall paintings by Johann Christoph Handke of Olomouc, decor and sculptural elements by Franz Mangoldt of Moravia and Italian master :de:Ignatius Provisore - which has been so well preserved.

•	Oratorium Marianum, with Baroque interior and furnishings as rich as in Aula Leopoldina, originally served as a chapel between 1728 and 1741. Following the secularisation of the Jesuit Order and the establishment of the University in 1811, Oratorium was converted into a concert Musical Hall.

•	Mathematical Tower with a viewing terrace at 42 meters is the former Astronomical Observatory, designed in 1791 by a Jesuit and professor of the University, :de:Longinus Anton Jungnitz. It still houses the original first instrument – the stone line on the floor marking the meridian. It is the only instrument of this kind in Poland.

•	and three exhibition rooms: Roman Longchamps de Bérier Hall, Stefan Banach Hall, and Pillar Hall.

The Museum has a historic profile, and its collections are largely devoted to the history of the University, from the 15th century to the present day. The oldest collections still have descriptive fiches of Leopoldina Academy, although the majority comes from later periods, after 1811.

Literature 

Henryk Dziurla, University of Wrocław, Wrocław-Warszawa-Kraków-Gdańsk 1976.

Urszula Bończuk-Dawidziuk / Magdalena Palica: Art collections, in: Commemorative Book for the 200th Anniversary of the Establishment of the State University in Wrocław, ed. Jan Harasimowicz, vol. 2: Universitas litterarum Wratislaviensis 1811-1945, Wrocław 2013, p. 528-545.

See also
 List of Jesuit sites

External links 
Strona internetowa Muzeum Uniwersytetu Wrocławskiego
Multimedialna Baza Danych Muzeum Uniwersytetu Wrocławskiego

References 

University of Wrocław
Museums established in 1992
1992 establishments in Poland